WSUX (1280 AM) is a radio station licensed to serve Seaford, Delaware. It aired an Adult Hits format. WSUX also airs on 93.9 FM using the FM translator W230CO.

The station has been assigned these call letters by the Federal Communications Commission since October 14, 2015.

On July 12, 2017, WSUX & W242AV went dark. Nothing listed as to why on the FCC website, but representatives from its sister station, 101.1 Jack FM in Salisbury, noted ownership of the Seaford station.

On August 14, 2017, WSUX & W242AV starting playing Spanish music as La Z Mx Radio, "The Letter that ignites your music". Effective September 11, 2017, translator W242AV moved to 93.9 FM as W230CO.

Translators

References

External links

SUX (AM)
Radio stations established in 1955
1955 establishments in Delaware